The Treaty of Frankfurt, also known as the Truce of Frankfurt, was a formal agreement of peace between Charles V, Holy Roman Emperor and Protestants on 19 April 1539. The parties met at Frankfurt-on-the-Main, and the Lutherans were represented by Philip Melanchthon. The treaty stated that the emperor would not take any violent actions against the Protestants, who had formed an alliance known as the Schmalkaldic League, for fifteen months starting 1 May; during this time both parties could try to resolve the differences in their confessions. As a result of this peace, the Schmalkaldic League lost the protection of France.

Notes

Bibliography 
 
 
 
 

Schmalkaldic League
Frankfurt (1539)
1539 in the Holy Roman Empire
1539 in Christianity
Reformation in Germany
1539 treaties